Mister Mosquito, spelled Mr Moskeeto in PAL regions and known in Japan as , is a video game developed by ZOOM Inc. for the PlayStation 2 (PS2) video game console. The game was first released in Japan by Sony on June 21, 2001, and the following March in other territories as part of the Eidos Interactive "Fresh Games" label.

The player controls a mosquito named "Mister Mosquito", the game's title character, who has taken up residency in the house of the Yamada family, life-sized humans that serve as the protagonist's food source in the game. The goal of the game is to stock up on blood through the summer so that the mosquito will survive the winter ahead. The player is tasked with sucking blood from specific body parts of the family members without being noticed. If the player is not careful, the human will become stressed and eventually attack.

Gameplay
The gameplay revolves around one thing: sucking blood from the Yamada family while they go about their everyday business. However, the player can only suck from a designated body area which is only available at specific times. Each family member follows a set looping pattern of movements. By following these movements, the player must fill a quota of blood for each stage. The challenge in bloodsucking is that each victim has a "stress meter". The player must make sure that the victim stays unaware. Sucking too fast or too slow will increase the victim's stress level. If Mister Mosquito is swatted while sucking blood, instant death occurs. If the player is noticed by a victim while flying around, Battle Mode begins, played out like a boss battle. The victim tries to attack Mister Mosquito through various means. To calm them, the player must hit a number of pressure points, relieving them of tension. Once they are relaxed enough, they return to their business.

The game is made up of a series of stages which must be unlocked in order by completing each previous stage. Players can choose their own path though each stage. At the start of each stage is a briefing detailing the room where the stage takes place, the victim and area(s) on their body from which blood can be sucked, and any prevalent dangers. The rooms in each stage are fully explorable. Each room has items hidden in obscure places which can bring various benefits.

Development
Mister Mosquito was first announced in March 2001 just prior to the Tokyo Game Show. The game was published in Japan by Sony on June 21, 2001. Eidos Interactive published the game in North America and PAL regions on March 13 and March 22, 2002, respectively, under its "Fresh Games" label. According to Eidos' Kevin Gill, the company chose to release games like Mister Mosquito because they are often called "quirky" or "odd" with "brilliant" gameplay that are otherwise unlikely to be localized outside Japan.

Reception and legacy

In 2008, Game Informer named Mister Mosquito one of "The Top Ten Weirdest Games of All Time".  The game was also included by G4 on its own list of weird games. GamesRadar included Mister Mosquito on its list of "The Top 7... games that are cheaper than therapy" as a cure for entomophobia and on its list of "Rubbish animals that got turned into video game heroes". Contributor Matt Cundy comically summarized in the latter list, "Given that mosquitoes kill millions of people every year, we'd have thought a game that put players in control of such a notorious serial killer would have met with more controversy".

According to Famitsu, Mister Mosquito was the fifth best-selling video game in Japan during its release week at 41,006 copies sold. Approximately 160,210 copies were sold in the country by the end of 2001. The game was released as part of Sony's PlayStation 2 the Best line of budget titles the following year. Sales of Mister Mosquito in other territories were apparently much poorer. On July 3, 2003, a sequel called  was released only in Japan. The game takes place in Hawaii, after the Yamada family wins a vacation from a local shop. The gameplay is essentially the same as in Mister Mosquito, but adds a number of new features. It allows the player to suck blood from any part of a human's body, not just designated points. Pressure points now allow the player to suck more blood from certain points. Finally, a new relaxation point system gives the player the opportunity to calm down an attacker if he is being chased. In 2004, Official U.S. PlayStation Magazine named the sequel as one of several Japanese and European games the publication wanted localized in North America.

References

2001 video games
Action video games
Cancelled GameCube games
Cancelled Xbox games
Eidos Interactive games
Fictional insects
PlayStation 2 games
PlayStation 2-only games
Simulation video games
Sony Interactive Entertainment franchises
Sony Interactive Entertainment games
Video games about insects
Video games developed in Japan
Zoom (video game company) games
Single-player video games